Gary Chown (born November 4, 1951) is a former Grey Cup champion offensive lineman and linebacker who played four seasons for the Montreal Alouettes of the Canadian Football League, winning two Grey Cup Championships. He played 40 regular season games for the Larks.

External links
CFLAPEDIA BIO
FANBASE BIO

1951 births
Bishop's Gaiters football players
Canadian football offensive linemen
Living people
Montreal Alouettes players
Players of Canadian football from Ontario
Canadian football people from Ottawa